
Year 399 (CCCXCIX) was a common year starting on Saturday (link will display the full calendar) of the Julian calendar. At the time, it was known as the Year of the Consulship of Eutropius and Theodorus (or, less frequently, year 1152 Ab urbe condita). The denomination 399 for this year has been used since the early medieval period, when the Anno Domini calendar era became the prevalent method in Europe for naming years.

Events 
 By place 

 Roman Empire 
 The boy Emperor Honorius of the Western Roman Empire (who is only 15 years old), closes the gladiatorial schools in Rome, and legally ends munera (gladiator games).
 Flavius Mallius Theodorus becomes Roman consul and official at the imperial court of emperor Arcadius. 
 Gainas, a Gothic leader, is made magister militum and forms an alliance with deserters of Tribigild along the Bosphorus. He proclaims himself co-regent (usurper), and installs his forces in Constantinople. Gainas deposes anti-Gothic officials and has Eutropius, imperial advisor (cubicularius), executed.

 Middle East 
 King Bahram IV dies after an 11-year reign. He is succeeded by Yazdegerd I, who becomes the thirteenth Sassanid Emperor of Persia.

 Asia 
 Fa-Hien, Chinese Buddhist monk, travels to India, Sri Lanka and Kapilavastu (modern Nepal).
Xianbei kingdom of Southern Yan conquers Qing Province (modern central and eastern Shandong) from the Eastern Jin

 By topic 

 Religion 
 November 26 – Pope Siricius dies at Rome after a 15-year reign in which he has commanded celibacy for priests, asserted papal authority over the entire Western Church, and threatened to impose sanctions on those who do not follow his dictates. 
 Anastasius I succeeds Siricius as the 39th pope. He seeks to reconcile the churches of Rome and Antioch. Anastasius also condemns the doctrine of Origen. 
 Flavian I is acknowledged as legitimate bishop of Antioch by the Church of Rome.

Births 
 Narsai, Syriac poet and theologian (approximate date)

Deaths 
 November 26 – Pope Siricius 
 Bahram IV, king of the Sassanid Empire (Persia)
 Eutropius, Roman consul and eunuch 
 Evagrius Ponticus, Christian monk and ascetic (b. 345)
 Fabiola, Christian saint
 Nintoku, emperor of Japan
 Tribigild, Ostrogothic general
 Tufa Wugu, prince of the Xianbei state Southern Liang
 Yuan Shansong, official and poet of the Jin Dynasty

References